Edward Hyland, more commonly known as Eddie Hyland, (born 24 April 1984 in Dublin, Ireland) is an Irish professional boxer who fights in the super featherweight division.

Professional career

Debut
Hyland turned professional in November 2004 at the  Altrincham leisure centre, England on an undercard of  bill that included Jamie Moore and Brian Magee. In his debut Hyland fellow Buster Dennis on points over four rounds.

Irish title
He is the Irish super featherweight title holder, defeating Kevin O'Hara for the belt on points.

References

External links
 

Living people
1981 births
Irish male boxers
Super-featherweight boxers